Siracourt is a commune in the Pas-de-Calais department in the Hauts-de-France region of France.

Geography

Population

Places of interest
 The modern church of St. Germain, rebuilt, along with the entire village after World War II.
 The Siracourt V-1 bunker, built during World War II.

See also
 Communes of the Pas-de-Calais department

References

Communes of Pas-de-Calais